Amadeo Österreichische Schallplatten Ges.m.b.H. (Amadeo Austrian Records Limited) was an Austrian record label founded in 1956 and based in Vienna. "Ges.m.b.H." is an abbreviation for Gesellschaft mit beschränkter Haftung, an Austrian Limited Liability Company.

Acquisition by Polydor 
In June 1974, Polydor International purchased all the shares of the Amadeo Joint Stock Company, changing the companies configuration to Amadeo Ltd. Co. Stefan von Friedberg, then Amadeo's president, resigned and accepted a position as general manager of Ariola Schallplatten. Gerhard Gebhardt, who, at the time, had responsibility for all Austrian companies in the Polydor group, became the new general manager. Also, Franz Wallner, who had served as manager of exports and special disks at Phonodisc, became manager of marketing and sales. Polydor is part of Universal Music Group.

Recording artists 
Classical

 Vienna Radio Symphony Orchestra

Jazz

 Christian Maurer
 Wolfgang Puschnig
 Vienna Art Orchestra
 Wolfgang Muthspiel
 Christian Muthspiel
 Linda Sharrock
 Woody Schabata
 Karlheinz Miklin
 Hans Joachim Roedelius
 Duo Due
 Air Mail
 Bumi Fian
 Red Sun
 Roland Dahinden
 Harry Pepl
 Georg Breinschmid
 Nicos Jaritz
 Willi Fantl
 Fred Martin
 Vic Dickenson
 Ruby Braff
 Hans Koller
 James P. Johnson
 Kansas City Six
 Ingo
 Fred Böhler
 Ted Evans
 Dieter Glawischnig
 Josel Trio
 Magnolia Jazz Band
 Harald Neuwirth
 New Austrian Big Band
 Original Storyville Jazzband
 Printers Jazzband
 Twilight Stompers
 Vienna Jazz Group
 Wirkliches Jazztrio
 The Monterey Moodmixers
 Oscar Klein
 Franco Ambrosetti
 Friedrich Gulda
 Sextett Der Preistrager
 Karel Krautgartner
 Bill Grah
 Peter Haydu
 Blue Brass Connection
 Paul Whiteman
 Antonio Carlos Jobim
 Buck Clayton
 Rolf Kuhn
 Sidney Bechet

Pop

 Jack Grunsky (Jack's Angels)

Personnel 
Under the independent label
 Dr. Henry Haerdtl, founder and managing director until 1966
 Stefan von Friedberg, who joined Amadeo in 1961 and served as director of sales and exports, became managing director in 1966
 Picco Pacher, manager
Under the ownership of Polydor
 Gerhard Gebhardt, general manager
 Franz Wallner, manager marketing & sales (Wallner moved on to become director of Musica Musikverlag, an Austrian record label)
 Wolfgang Arming, president of Polygram Austria

References 

Record label distributors
Austrian record labels
Austrian record producers
Record labels established in 1956
Jazz record labels